The Pan American Development Foundation (PADF) believes in creating a hemisphere of opportunity, for all. PADF works across Latin America and the Caribbean to make the region stronger—more healthy, peaceful, just, inclusive, resilient, and sustainable for current and future generations. For 60 years, PADF has served the most vulnerable communities, investing resources throughout the hemisphere. The organization partners with and enables civil society, governments, and the private sector for the greater good of the region.

History
PADF was established in 1962, by the Organization of American States (OAS), as part of the Alliance for Progress initiated by U.S. President John F. Kennedy. As a strategic partner and proud affiliate of the OAS, PADF is part of the Inter-American System while maintaining an independent status. PADF is committed to upholding OAS’ values and supporting its mission of achieving more rights for more people.

Programs

PADF works to address the immediate needs of vulnerable populations, especially those in crisis – those suffering from natural disasters, gender-based violence, at-risk youth, migrants, minorities, LGBTQI+, rural communities, and others; on job creation and entrepreneurship in partnership with the private sector and aligned with green/blue jobs and community resilience approaches; and to strengthen democracy, rule of law, and justice, while advancing the rights of women and workers, protecting those vulnerable to trafficking in persons, and contributing to security systems, especially anti-corruption, crime and violence prevention, and criminal justice reform. 

PADF's work is driven by impact and informed by the global sustainable development goals that provide a shared blueprint for peace and prosperity for people and the planet, now and into the future. 

PADF's key goal areas are: 

 Addressing the Needs of Vulnerable Populations: PADF strives to reduce vulnerability, address immediate needs, and strengthen coping capabilities of vulnerable populations, especially those affected by natural hazards and complex humanitarian emergencies, as well as victims of gender-based violence, at-risk youth, migrants, minorities, LGBTQI+, rural communities, and others. 

 Promoting Sustainable Livelihoods: PADF focuses on the relationships between people, production, and planet to achieve sustainable and inclusive growth. PADF provides education and training for employability, facilitate employment and job creation, and incubate and grow entrepreneurship, all with an environmental lens. The organization promotes 21st century workforce skills, blue, green, and circular economy livelihoods, alternative energy efforts, and nature-based solutions.

 Advancing Rights and Justice: PADF advances inclusive and accountable governance systems and democratic processes throughout the region, building on its knowledge and track record of working with civil society organizations, human rights defenders, journalists, community groups, public sector officials, and institutions to promote an enabling environment for the protection of human rights, the rule of law, and access to justice.

At the heart of what PADF does, is its commitment to serving the most vulnerable communities. PADF's mission is driven by a firm belief in creating a hemisphere of opportunity, for all. PADF supports:

 Women and Girls: PADF believes that structural and cultural changes are needed to ensure the exercise of women’s and girls’ rights and facilitate their inclusion and equal participation. PADF supports the work of feminist and women’s organizations to advocate for their rights and achieve sustainable change. 

 Migrants and Displaced Persons: PADF believes that human mobility is a human right. The organization implements local responses to our region’s growing migration, prioritizing the safety, health, and livelihoods of those seeking better lives and of the communities that host them. PADF also works to address the root causes of migration by creating access to opportunities and reducing violence and insecurity. 

 Youth: PADF believes that youth engagement and positive development is key to creating effective social, economic, and political change. PADF builds skills and provide opportunities for at-risk youth to become active participants in their communities. 

 Indigenous Groups: PADF believes in supporting indigenous groups and their organizations to bring an end to all forms of discrimination and oppression throughout our hemisphere. PADF works to ensure their right to self-determination, including preservation of their lands, which are often rich in natural resources and biodiversity, and traditions.

 Afro-Descendants: PADF believes that fighting racism and discrimination is critical to protecting human rights. PADF works to ensure the voices and perspectives of Afro-descendants are included in the decision making at the local, national, and regional levels. 

 LGBTQI+: PADF believes that everyone, regardless of their sexual orientation or gender identity, deserves equal access to opportunities. PADF supports the equal rights and promote the safety of LGBTQI+ communities in the Western Hemisphere.

Climate Accountability 
On December 1, 2021, PADF joined Climate Accountability in Development (CAD), a group of international development organizations committed to charting a new path forward for climate accountability in the development sector.

As members of CAD, PADF measures its greenhouse gas (GHG) emissions each year starting off with a baseline of emissions from fiscal year 2019. PADF will reduce its GHG emissions 30% by 2030, based on the 2019 baseline.

Leadership 
PADF's leadership team is a passionate and committed team, with deep technical expertise, extensive knowledge of Latin America and the Caribbean, and strong community connections.

Executive Team:

 Executive Director: Katie Taylor
 Chief Technical Leadership Officer: Dr. Elizabeth Fox
 Chief Information Officer: Guillermo Florez
 Chief of Staff: Nadia Cherrouk

The PADF Board of Trustees is composed of seasoned and diverse executives, who provide strategic leadership to achieve the organization’s mission of investing resources in Latin America and the Caribbean to create opportunities for all.

Elected Board Officers:

 President and General Counsel: Alexandra Aguirre
 1st Vice President: Mina Pacheco Nazemi
 2nd Vice President: German Herrera
 Treasurer: Nicholas Galt
 Secretary: Alexandra Valderrama

Funding 
PADF is a 501(c)(3) tax-exempt organization in the United States. It receives donations from individuals, corporations, multilateral organizations (such as the World Bank, United Nations, Inter-American Development Bank, among others), and governments. It is audited each year and an annual statement is published in its annual report.

References

External links 
 

Development charities based in the United States
Organizations established in 1962
Organization of American States
Charities based in Washington, D.C.